The 2012 Royal Cup NLB Montenegro was a professional tennis tournament played on clay courts. It was the ninth edition of the tournament which was part of the 2012 ITF Women's Circuit. It took place in Podgorica, Montenegro on 17–23 September 2012.

WTA entrants

Seeds 

 1 Rankings are as of 10 September 2012.

Other entrants 
The following players received wildcards into the singles main draw:
  Andreja Klepač
  Maša Marc
  Andjela Novčić
  Dejana Raickovic

The following players received entry from the qualifying draw:
  Ema Mikulčić
  Karin Morgošová
  Teodora Mirčić
  Anna Zaja

The following players received by a lucky loser spot:
  Natalija Kostić
  Karla Popović

The following player received by a Special Ranking:
  Renata Voráčová

Champions

Singles 

  Renata Voráčová def.  Maria Elena Camerin, 3–6, 6–2, 6–0

Doubles 

  Nicole Clerico /  Anna Zaja def.  Mailen Auroux /  María Irigoyen, 4–6, 6–3, [11–9]

External links 
 ITF Search
 Official site

Royal Cup NLB Montenegro
Clay court tennis tournaments
Tennis tournaments in Montenegro
21st century in Podgorica
Sports competitions in Podgorica